Geneva-on-the-Lake may refer to:

 Geneva-on-the-Lake, Ohio
 Nester House (Geneva, New York), also known as Geneva-on-the-Lake and listed on the NRHP in New York